Sathi railway station is a railway station on Muzaffarpur–Gorakhpur main line under the Samastipur railway division of East Central Railway zone. This is situated beside Sathi Bazar Main Road at Paroraha, Sathi in West Champaran district of the Indian state of Bihar.

References

Railway stations in West Champaran district
Samastipur railway division